DNAnexus is an American company that provides a cloud-based data analysis and management platform for DNA sequence data. It is based in Mountain View, California, and was founded in 2009 by Stanford University professors Serafim Batzoglou and Arend Sidow and Stanford computer scientist Andreas Sundquist.

History 

DNAnexus was founded in early 2009 as a spin-off from Stanford University to address the need for computing infrastructure in DNA sequence analysis.
The company raised $1.55 million in venture capital funding from First Round Capital, K9 Ventures, and SoftTech VC.

In April 2010, DNAnexus launched its cloud-based sequence data service.

In August 2011, the company expanded its recruiting process by offering an incentive of $20,000 plus a full genome sequence to employees who referred a software engineer.

In October 2011, DNAnexus announced that it had raised $15 million from Google Ventures, TPG Biotech, First Round Capital, SoftTech VC, K9 Ventures, and Felicis Ventures.

In 2012, DNAnexus CEO and co-founder Andreas Sundquist was named one of FierceBiotech’s Top 10 Biotech Techies.

In October 2013, the company announced a collaboration with the Human Genome Sequencing Center at Baylor College of Medicine. Through the partnership, DNAnexus and scientists at Baylor performed the largest cloud-based genomics analysis to date, processing 3,751 whole human genomes and 10,771 exomes. Analysis was run using Amazon Web Services infrastructure and conducted for the Cohorts for Heart and Aging Research in Genomic Epidemiology (CHARGE) consortium. The effort used 2.4 million core-hours of computational time and generated 430 terabytes of data.

The company announced a series C venture funding round of $15 million in January 2014. Investors included Claremont Creek Ventures, First Round Capital, Google Ventures, and TPG Biotech.

Technology 

DNAnexus uses cloud computing from Amazon Web Services. Customers of DNAnexus use those computational resources to run analysis programs on DNA sequence data and to store that data. The product includes applications for read mapping, RNA-seq, ChIP-seq, and genomic variant analysis.

In October 2011, following news that the National Center for Biotechnology Information would phase out funding for its Sequence Read Archive (SRA), DNAnexus said it was working with Google Cloud Storage to host a mirror of the SRA database. The SRA was started by NCBI in 2007 to collect sequence data produced by next-generation sequencing instruments. DNAnexus developed a new web interface for the SRA and worked with Google to host more than 350 terabytes of DNA sequence data. In June 2012, DNAnexus ceased hosting the SRA data after NCBI announced that it would continue funding for the database. The company continues to provide a search and browsing interface for the NCBI-hosted SRA database.

In February 2012, the company announced a partnership with Geisinger Health System and the University of California, San Francisco, to develop the DNAnexus technology for application in clinical medicine. In September 2013, the company began offering its cloud-based platform-as-a-service to clinical testing laboratories for DNA sequence data analysis.

In June 2013, DNAnexus started a program to help software developers build applications that can be used on its platform.

References 

Companies based in Mountain View, California
Population genetics organizations